Mulato is an alternative spelling of "mulatto", an offensive and outdated classification for a person of both African and European ancestry.

Mulato may also refer to:

 Mulato pepper, a type of chili
 Another name for Comecrudo, one of a number of Comecrudan languages

See also
 Mulatos River, in Colombia
 Mulata (film), a Mexican drama